Aaron Victor Cicourel, who is professor emeritus of sociology at the University of California, San Diego, specializes in sociolinguistics, medical communication, decision-making, and child socialization. Early in his career, he was intellectually influenced greatly by Alfred Schutz, Erving Goffman, and Harold Garfinkel.

Career

After receiving his B.A and M.A. from UCLA and his Ph.D. from Cornell University, Cicourel accepted posts as visiting assistant professor at Northwestern University, assistant professor to associate professor at the University of California, Riverside,  visiting professor at the University of Buenos Aires in Argentina, lecturer in the Department of Sociology and associate research sociologist in the Center for the Study of Law and Society at the Universaity of California at Berkeley, visiting professor at Columbia University, professor of sociology at the University of California at Berkeley, professor of sociology at the University of California at Santa Barbara, professor in the School of Medicine and Department of Sociology at the University of California at San Diego, and research professor of cognitive science at the latter institution.

Cicourel held a Russell Sage Foundation Post Doctoral Fellowship at the University of California at Los Angeles Medical Center, a  National Science Foundation Senior Postdoctoral Fellowship at London University in England, a Guggenheim Fellowship at the University of Madrid in Spain, and was a Fulbright lecturer in Brazil and Spain.  In November 2007, he was awarded Docteur Honoris Causa by Université de Fribourg in Switzerland, and in 2008 was awarded Doctor Honoris Causa  Complutense University of Madrid.

He was elected Fellow of the American Academy of Arts and Sciences and of the American Association for the Advancement of Science. Cicourel lives in Berkeley, California.

Selected bibliography
 Le Raisonnement Medical. Paris: Seuil. (Also published in Korean)
 The Educational Decision-Makers. NY: Bobbs-Merrill (with J.Kituse) (Also published in Japanese)
 Cognitive Sociology: Language and Meaning in Social Interaction. New York: Free Press. 1974.
 Method and Measurement in Sociology. NY: Free Press. (Also published in German, Japanese and Spanish).
 Theory and Methods in a Study of Argentine Fertility. NY: Wiley-Interscience, 1974.
Cognitive Sociology: Language and Meaning in Social Interaction. London: Penguin (Published in French and German)
Language Use and Classroom Performance. (with others) NY: Academic Press, 1974.
The Social Organization of Juvenile Justice. NY: Wiley, 1968.  (Reprinted in 1976 and 1994)
French translation released in 2018, La justice des mineurs au quotidien de ses services, Editions ies, Genève (ebook available)
 Three Models of Discourse Analysis. Discourse Processes 3:101-131.
 Interpenetration of Communicative Contexts: Examples from Medical Encounters. Social Psychology Quarterly'
 Formal semantics, pragmatics, and situated meaning. In Pragmatics at Issue'', Vol. 1, edited by J. Verschueren. Amsterdam: John Benjamins.

References

American sociologists
Cornell University alumni
University of California, Los Angeles alumni
University of California, San Diego faculty
Living people
Year of birth missing (living people)